Extended synaptotagmin-2 is a protein that in humans is encoded by the ESYT2 gene.

References

Further reading